Meghanathan is an Indian actor who appears in Malayalam and Tamil films. The son of actor Balan K. Nair, he debuted in 1983 in the Malayalam film Asthram. He has acted in more than 50 Malayalam films.

Background
Meghanathan was born as the third child of Malayalam actor Balan K. Nair and Sarada Nair in Trivandrum, Kerala, India. He has two brothers (Anil and Ajayakumar) and two sisters (Latha and Sujatha). He had his primary education from Asan Memorial Association, Chennai, and has completed Diploma in Automobile engineering from Coimbatore. He made his debut through the Malayalam film Ashthram in 1983.

Meghanathan is married to Susmitha. The couple have a daughter, Parvathi. They are settled in Shoranur, Palakkad.

Filmography
{| class="wikitable"
|-
!Year!!Title!! Role!! Notes
|-
|2022||Kooman||S.I. Sukumaran||
|-
|2021|| One|| K.Ramachandran, Minister for Excise|| 
|-
|- Vikrithi 2019 Hasanikka
| rowspan="2" |2019|| Underworld||Shahul Hameed|| 
|-
|Mr. & Ms. Rowdy||Poornima's Father|| 
|-
| rowspan="2" |2018|| Johny Johny Yes Appa||S.I. Chandrappan||
|-
|Aadhi|| Mani Annan||
|-
| rowspan="3" |2017|| Sunday Holiday||S.I. Shafeeque. K.V||
|-
|Munthirivallikal Thalirkkumbol || Prabhakaran||
|-
|1971: Beyond Borders ||Sulaiman||
|-
| rowspan="2" |2016||Action Hero Biju||Rajendran||
|-
|Kohinoor|| ||
|-
|2015||Picket 43 ||Subedar Major Thampi||
|-
| rowspan="2" |2013||Kerala Today|| ||
|-
|Lisammayude Veedu |||| 
|-
|2011||Aazhakkadal|| ||
|-
|2012||Mizhi|| ||
|-
| rowspan="3" |2010||Thaskara Lahala||||
|-
|Canvas ||||
|-
|Thanthonni||Sub Inspector R. Ganeshan||
|-
| rowspan="3" |2008||Dalamarmarangal||Indusekharan||
|-
|Gulmohar ||||
|-
|Kanichikkulangarayil CBI|||| 
|-
| rowspan="3" |2006||Vaasthavam ||||
|-
|Pathaka ||City Police Commissioner Yousuf Ali IPS
|-
|Yes Your Honour||Lakshmanan||
|-
|2005|| Nerariyan CBI|| Padmanabhan Achary||
|-
| rowspan="2" |2004||Paanchajanyam ||||
|-
|Pravasam||||
|-
| rowspan="2" |2003||Chakram ||Gopalan||
|-
|Vellithira|| ||
|-
| rowspan="2" |2001||Chethaaram ||||
|-
|Uthaman |||| 
|-
| rowspan="3" |2000||Ente Priyappetta Muthuvinu ||||
|-
|Cover Story ||||
|-
|Kaathara ||||
|-
| rowspan="6" |1999||Vasanthiyum Lakshmiyum Pinne Njaanum ||||
|-
|Crime File |||| 
|-
|The Godman ||||
|-
|Pranaya Nilavu||||
|-
|Chandranudikkunna Dikkil |||| 
|-
|Thachiledathu Chundan |||| 
|-
| rowspan="2" |1998||Oru Maravathoor Kanavu|||| 
|-
|British Market ||||
|-
| rowspan="5" |1997||Mannaadiyaar Penninu Chenkotta Chekkan ||||
|-
|Newspaper Boy ||||
|-
|Guru Sishyan|| ||
|-
|Niyogam||||
|-
|Ullasapoongattu'||||
|-
|1996||Ee Puzhayum Kadannu ||||
|-
|1994||Malappuram Haji Mahanaya Joji|||| 
|-
| rowspan="3" |1993||Chamayam ||||
|-
|Bhoomi Geetham ||Parameshwaran||
|-
|Chenkol|| || 
|-
|1986||Panchagni|| || 
|-
|1983||Asthram|| || 
|-
|}

Awards
Flowers TV awards 2016 -Best Character Actor (Serial: Sthreetvam -Surya TV)

TV serials
 Sthreetvam (Surya TV)
 Meghasandesham (Kairali TV)
 Kathayariyathe (Surya TV)
 Snehanjali (Asianet)
 DhanumasappennuChandrettanum Shobeduthiyum (DD Malayalam)
 Parayan Baaki Vechathu'' (Surya TV) - Telefilm

References

External links

Indian male film actors
Male actors from Thiruvananthapuram
Male actors in Malayalam cinema
Living people
Year of birth missing (living people)
20th-century Indian male actors
21st-century Indian male actors
Indian male television actors
Male actors in Malayalam television